An intermetallic (also called an intermetallic compound, intermetallic alloy, ordered intermetallic alloy, and a long-range-ordered alloy) is a type of metallic alloy that forms an ordered solid-state compound between two or more metallic elements. Intermetallics are generally hard and brittle, with good high-temperature mechanical properties. They can be classified as stoichiometric or nonstoichiometic intermetallic compounds.  

Although the term "intermetallic compounds", as it applies to solid phases, has been in use for many years, its introduction was regretted, for example by Hume-Rothery in 1955.

Definitions

Research definition
Schulze in 1967 defined intermetallic compounds as solid phases containing two or more metallic elements, with optionally one or more non-metallic elements, whose crystal structure differs from that of the other constituents. Under this definition, the following are included:

Electron (or Hume-Rothery) compounds
Size packing phases. e.g. Laves phases, Frank–Kasper phases and Nowotny phases
Zintl phases

The definition of a metal is taken to include:

post-transition metals, i.e. aluminium, gallium, indium, thallium, tin, lead, and bismuth.
metalloids, e.g. silicon, germanium, arsenic, antimony and tellurium.

Homogeneous and heterogeneous solid solutions of metals, and interstitial compounds (such as carbides and nitrides), are excluded under this definition.  However, interstitial intermetallic compounds are included, as are alloys of intermetallic compounds with a metal.

Common use
In common use, the research definition, including post-transition metals and metalloids, is extended to include compounds such as cementite, Fe3C.  These compounds, sometimes termed interstitial compounds, can be stoichiometric, and share similar properties to the intermetallic compounds defined above.

Complexes
The term intermetallic is used to describe compounds involving two or more metals such as the cyclopentadienyl complex Cp6Ni2Zn4.

B2
A B2 intermetallic compound has equal numbers of atoms of two metals such as aluminium and iron, arranged as two interpenetrating simple cubic lattices of the component metals.

Properties and applications
Intermetallic compounds are generally brittle at room temperature and have high melting points. Cleavage or intergranular fracture modes are typical of intermetallics due to limited independent slip systems required for plastic deformation. However, there are some examples of intermetallics with ductile fracture modes such as Nb–15Al–40Ti. Other intermetallics can exhibit improved ductility by alloying with other elements to increase grain boundary cohesion. Alloying of other materials such as boron to improve grain boundary cohesion can improve ductility in many intermetallics. They often offer a compromise between ceramic and metallic properties when hardness and/or resistance to high temperatures is important enough to sacrifice some toughness and ease of processing. They can also display desirable magnetic, superconducting and chemical properties, due to their strong internal order and mixed (metallic and covalent/ionic) bonding, respectively. Intermetallics have given rise to various novel materials developments. Some examples include alnico and the hydrogen storage materials in nickel metal hydride batteries.  Ni3Al, which is the hardening phase in the familiar nickel-base super alloys, and the various titanium aluminides have also attracted interest for turbine blade applications, while the latter is also used in very small quantities for grain refinement of titanium alloys. Silicides, inter-metallic involving silicon, are utilized as barrier and contact layers in microelectronics.

Examples
Magnetic materials e.g. alnico, sendust, Permendur, FeCo, Terfenol-D
Superconductors e.g. A15 phases, niobium-tin
Hydrogen storage e.g. AB5 compounds (nickel metal hydride batteries)
Shape memory alloys e.g. Cu-Al-Ni (alloys of Cu3Al and nickel), Nitinol (NiTi)
Coating materials e.g. NiAl
High-temperature structural materials e.g. nickel aluminide, Ni3Al
Dental amalgams, which are alloys of intermetallics Ag3Sn and Cu3Sn
Gate contact/ barrier layer for microelectronics e.g. TiSi2
Laves phases (AB2), e.g., MgCu2, MgZn2 and MgNi2.

The formation of intermetallics can cause problems. For example, intermetallics of gold and aluminium can be a significant cause of wire bond failures in  semiconductor devices and other microelectronics devices.  The management of intermetallics is a major issue in the reliability of solder joints between electronic components.

Intermetallic particles

Intermetallic particles often form during solidification of metallic alloys, and can be used as a  dispersion strengthening mechanism.

History
Examples of intermetallics through history include:

Roman yellow brass, CuZn
Chinese high tin bronze, Cu31Sn8
Type metal, SbSn
Chinese white copper, CuNi 

German type metal is described as breaking like glass, not bending, softer than copper but more fusible than lead. The chemical formula does not agree with the one above; however, the properties match with an intermetallic compound or an alloy of one.

See also
 Complex metallic alloys
 Kirkendall effect
 Maraging steel
 Metallurgy
 Solid solution

References
 Gerhard Sauthoff: Intermetallics, Wiley-VCH, Weinheim 1995, 165 pages
 Intermetallics, Gerhard Sauthoff, Ullmann's Encyclopedia of Industrial Chemistry, Wiley Interscience. (Subscription required)

External links
 Intermetallics, scientific journal
 Intermetallic Creation and Growth – an article on the Wire Bond Website of the NASA Goddard Space Flight Center.
 Intermetallics project (IMPRESS Intermetallics project at the European Space Agency)
 Video of an AB5 intermetallic compound solidifying/freezing